Ai Sugiyama was the defending champion, but lost in first round to Dinara Safina.

Patty Schnyder won the title by defeating Samantha Stosur 1–6, 6–3, 7–5 in the final.

Seeds

Draw

Finals

Top half

Bottom half

References
 Main and Qualifying draws

Uncle
2005 Uncle Tobys Hardcourts